The Greenstone and Caples Tracks form a tramping (hiking)  circuit which is located in the South Island of New Zealand. Each track can be completed by itself and are linked by the McKellar Saddle while the loop also links to several other tracks including the New Zealand Great Walk of the Routeburn Track as well as the Mavora Lakes Conservation Park tracks. All of these areas are part of the Te Wāhipounamu/South-West New Zealand World Heritage Area.

Ownership and access 
The Caples Track follows the Caples River up the privately owned Caples Valley while the Greenstone Track follows the Greenstone River in the Greenstone Valley which is also privately owned. Much of the area is owned by the local tribe of the Ngāi Tahu while most of the tracks are in the Greenstone and Caples Conservation Areas with some also being a part of the Fiordland National Park around Lake McKellar. The whole track is open to public access as long as stock is not disturbed.

Huts 

There are three public huts on the tracks, the Greenstone Hut, the McKellar Hut and the Mid Caples Hut. There are also several private huts as well as some hunters huts: The Mid Greenstone Hut and the Upper Caples Hut.

Access to the Mavora Lakes Conservation Park is from the Greenstone Hut. Access to the Routeburn Track is near McKellar Hut.

References

External links

Department of Conservation

Hiking and tramping tracks in Fiordland
Protected areas of Southland, New Zealand